Harrington is a hamlet and civil parish in the East Lindsey district of Lincolnshire, England.

History

Harrington is not listed in Domesday Book of 1086. In the 14th century the manor of Harrington passed from the de Harington family to the Copledyke family, and in 1673 the estate was bought by Vincent Amcotts.

Landmarks

The parish church is a Grade II* listed building dedicated to Saint Mary, dating from the 13th century, and largely rebuilt in 1854-55 by Samuel Sanders Teulon. In the south side of the nave is a tomb containing the 14th-century effigy of a knight in chain mail. Under the tower is the black stone tomb of John Copledike who died in 1557 and his wife who died in 1552. In the chancel is a further tomb to John Copledike who died in 1585 and his wife who died 1582, and an alabaster memorial to Francis Copuldyck and his wife and family dated 1599.

Harrington Hall is a Grade I listed red-brick country house, built in the late 17th century by Vincent Amcotts, to replace a mansion house built for the Copledyke family about 1575, according to a dated beam. Altered and extended in the 18th century, it was extensively damaged by fire in November 1991 and has since been repaired. The walled garden of Harrington Hall is the one that Alfred Lord Tennyson mentioned in his poem Maud 1855. The grounds are no longer open to the public as it became a wholly private residence in 2014.

References

External links

Villages in Lincolnshire
Civil parishes in Lincolnshire
East Lindsey District